Dai Qingyao (born 26 September 1991) is a Chinese male volleyball player. He is part of the China men's national volleyball team. On club level he plays for Shanghai.

References

External links
 Dai Qingyao at FIVB.org
 

1991 births
Living people
Chinese men's volleyball players
Place of birth missing (living people)
Volleyball players from Shanghai
21st-century Chinese people